The Velykyi Kuialnyk or Bolshoy Kuyalnik is a river in Podilsk and Berezivka Raions of Odesa Oblast in Ukraine. Its mouth is the Kuialnyk Estuary of the Black Sea. The urban-type settlements of Shyriaieve and Ivanivka are located on the banks of the Velykyi Kuialnyk.

In the past, the Velykyi Kuialnyk was navigable and, together with the Dniester, was used to transport goods to the Black Sea, bypassing the cascades at the Dnieper River. In 2007-2008, illegal sand diggers built a dam in the mouth of the Velykyi Kuialnyk, so that the river does not empty to the sea anymore. The dam has never been demolished, leading to drying out of the estuary.

References

Rivers of Odesa Oblast
Tributaries of the Black Sea